Myelobia zeuzeroides is a moth in the family Crambidae. It is found in Brazil (Ega).

References

Moths described in 1865
Chiloini